The KFConsole is a home video game console announced by KFC Gaming and Cooler Master. After its initial announcement in June 2020, it was widely believed to be a hoax, until an official reveal in December. The console boasts various features, including ray tracing, up to 4K resolution, and 240Hz output. The signature feature of the device is a proprietary "Chicken Chamber" that can store and warm chicken. No price or release date have been given, and it is unclear if the console will ever be released.

Design 
The KFConsole's design is inspired by KFC's Bargain Bucket. The console itself is an all-black cylinder with a backlit red power button on the front below the Chicken Chamber, which has the red KFConsole logo on it. The Chicken Chamber is a drawer that opens to reveal a compartment for storing food, which uses the system's heat and airflow system to warm the contents.

Specifications 
Technically, from what is known of the KFConsole, it is more-closely related to a gaming PC than to a traditional home video game console, as it is not being developed by a video game company to run proprietary software, and is being billed as having upgradable components which most consoles do not feature. The KFConsole is powered by a Intel NUC 9 Extreme Compute Element. The console is capable of harnessing Nvidia's ray tracing and 4K resolution, with support for 240 Hz output. The device also has support for virtual reality. The Asus-powered graphics will apparently be housed in a "first-of-its-kind hot-swappable GPU slot" which, according to KFC, will keep the device as "the most powerful console for generations to come."

Release 
The KFConsole was officially announced on December 22, 2020. No official release date has been announced for the console, and the pricing has also not been revealed.

See also 
Cooler Master
KFC advertising

References 

KFC
Home video game consoles
2020 in video gaming
X86-based game consoles